Telescope Eyes E.P. is an EP of the band Eisley released January 25, 2005 on Reprise Records.

Track listing
All songs written by Eisley.

Eisley albums
2005 EPs